Tamopsis is a genus of tree trunk spiders that was first described by B. Baehr & M. Baehr in 1987. Like other members of the family, they may be called two-tailed spiders, referring to two elongated spinnerets. The name is derived from the genus Tama and the Ancient Greek  (-opsis), meaning "resembling".

These spiders differ from Tama edwardsi in the more complex palpal bulb and the median apophysis that may either be coiled or have a hook- or spoon-shaped structure at its tip. These species are generally arboreal, where the spiders originally included in Tama in 1987 are mainly terrestrial.

Description
Tamopsis species are small to medium-sized spiders. They resemble other members of the family Hersiliidae in having unusually long posterior lateral spinnerets (the outside rear pair), which in some species can be longer than the abdomen. They live in trees rather than on the ground and do not make complex webs. Their legs are relatively long, with an undivided metatarsus. The chelicerae have three teeth at the front edge. The male palpal bulb has a complex median apophysis (projection), sometimes coiled and usually with a hook-shaped structure at the end. The embolus of the palpal bulb can slide out of a lateral apophysis, which otherwise partly or completely hides it. The female has one to three seminal receptacles on each side.

Species
In 1987, Barbara Baehr and Martin Baehr reviewed the Australian members of the family Hersiliidae. They erected a new genus Tamopsis, and described 25 new species within the genus. Two species formerly placed in the genus Tama were transferred to Tamopsis. They described even more species in a series of papers from 1988 to 1998.

Two Australian species, T. novaehollandiae and T. brachyura, are regarded as doubtful because their described types are either juveniles or have been lost and are not identifiable from their descriptions.

 it contains fifty species found in Australia and New Guinea:
Tamopsis amplithorax Baehr & Baehr, 1987 – Australia (Western Australia)
Tamopsis arnhemensis Baehr & Baehr, 1987 – Australia (Northern Territory, Queensland)
Tamopsis brachycauda Baehr & Baehr, 1987 – Australia (Queensland, New South Wales)
Tamopsis brevipes Baehr & Baehr, 1987 – Australia (New South Wales)
Tamopsis brisbanensis Baehr & Baehr, 1987 – Australia (Queensland, New South Wales)
Tamopsis centralis Baehr & Baehr, 1987 – Australia (Queensland)
Tamopsis circumvidens Baehr & Baehr, 1987 – Australia (Western Australia, Victoria)
Tamopsis cooloolensis Baehr & Baehr, 1987 – Australia (Queensland)
Tamopsis darlingtoniana Baehr & Baehr, 1987 – Australia (Western Australia)
Tamopsis daviesae Baehr & Baehr, 1987 – Australia (Queensland)
Tamopsis depressa Baehr & Baehr, 1992 – Australia (Western Australia, Northern Territory)
Tamopsis ediacarae Baehr & Baehr, 1988 – Australia (South Australia)
Tamopsis eucalypti (Rainbow, 1900) (type) – Australia (Queensland to South Australia)
Tamopsis facialis Baehr & Baehr, 1993 – Australia (Western Australia, South Australia, New South Wales)
Tamopsis fickerti (L. Koch, 1876) – Australia (Queensland, New South Wales, Victoria)
Tamopsis fitzroyensis Baehr & Baehr, 1987 – Australia (Western Australia, Queensland)
Tamopsis floreni Rheims & Brescovit, 2004 – Borneo
Tamopsis forrestae Baehr & Baehr, 1988 – Australia (Queensland)
Tamopsis gibbosa Baehr & Baehr, 1993 – Australia (Western Australia, South Australia)
Tamopsis gracilis Baehr & Baehr, 1993 – Australia (Western Australia)
Tamopsis grayi Baehr & Baehr, 1987 – Australia (New South Wales)
Tamopsis harveyi Baehr & Baehr, 1993 – Australia (Northern Territory)
Tamopsis hirsti Baehr & Baehr, 1998 – Australia (South Australia)
Tamopsis jongi Baehr & Baehr, 1995 – Australia (Western Australia)
Tamopsis kimberleyana Baehr & Baehr, 1998 – Australia (Western Australia)
Tamopsis kochi Baehr & Baehr, 1987 – Australia (Western Australia, New South Wales)
Tamopsis leichhardtiana Baehr & Baehr, 1987 – Australia (Western Australia, Northern Territory, Queensland)
Tamopsis longbottomi Baehr & Baehr, 1993 – Australia (Northern Territory)
Tamopsis mainae Baehr & Baehr, 1993 – Australia (Western Australia)
Tamopsis mallee Baehr & Baehr, 1989 – Australia (Western, South Australia, New South Wales)
Tamopsis minor Baehr & Baehr, 1998 – Australia (Western Australia)
Tamopsis nanutarrae Baehr & Baehr, 1989 – Australia (Western Australia)
Tamopsis occidentalis Baehr & Baehr, 1987 – Australia (Western Australia)
Tamopsis perthensis Baehr & Baehr, 1987 – Australia (Western Australia)
Tamopsis petricola Baehr & Baehr, 1995 – Australia (Queensland)
Tamopsis piankai Baehr & Baehr, 1993 – Australia (Western Australia)
Tamopsis platycephala Baehr & Baehr, 1987 – Australia (Queensland)
Tamopsis pseudocircumvidens Baehr & Baehr, 1987 – Australia (Western Australia, South Australia, Northern Territory)
Tamopsis queenslandica Baehr & Baehr, 1987 – Australia (Queensland, New South Wales)
Tamopsis raveni Baehr & Baehr, 1987 – Australia (Queensland, South Australia)
Tamopsis reevesbyana Baehr & Baehr, 1987 – Australia (Western Australia, South Australia)
Tamopsis riverinae Baehr & Baehr, 1993 – Australia (New South Wales)
Tamopsis rossi Baehr & Baehr, 1987 – Australia (Western Australia)
Tamopsis transiens Baehr & Baehr, 1992 – Australia (Western Australia, Northern Territory, Victoria)
Tamopsis trionix Baehr & Baehr, 1987 – Australia (Queensland)
Tamopsis tropica Baehr & Baehr, 1987 – Australia (Northern Territory, Queensland)
Tamopsis tweedensis Baehr & Baehr, 1987 – Australia (Queensland, New South Wales)
Tamopsis warialdae Baehr & Baehr, 1998 – Australia (New South Wales)
Tamopsis wau Baehr & Baehr, 1993 – New Guinea
Tamopsis weiri Baehr & Baehr, 1995 – Australia (Western Australia)

References

Araneomorphae genera
Hersiliidae
Spiders of Asia
Spiders of Australia